Haplogroup R2, or R-M479, is a Y-chromosome haplogroup characterized by genetic marker M479. It is one of two primary descendants of Haplogroup R (R-M207), the other being R1 (R-M173).

R-M479 has been concentrated geographically in South Asia and Central Asia since prehistory. It appears to reach its highest levels among the Burusho people in North Pakistan.  However, it also appears to be present at low levels in the Caucasus, Iran, Anatolia and Europe.

It has two primary branches: R2a (M124) and R2b (R-FGC21706)

Structure 
    R (M207/Page37/UTY2)
   R1 (M173/P241/Page29)
   R2 (M479/PF6107, L266/PF6108, L722, L726)
  R2a (M124, F820/Page4, L381, P249)
 R2a1   (L263)
 R2a2   (P267/PF6109)
 R2b   (FGC21706, FGC50198, FGC50325, FGC50333, SK2163, SK2164, SK2165, SK2166)
 R2b1  (FGC50339)

Source: ISOGG 2017.

Geographical distribution 
Most research has tested only for the presence of R-M479 (R2) and R-M124 (R2a) – or SNPs downstream from M124 like P249, P267, L266, PAGES00004, and L381 SNPs). Because the other primary branch, R2b (R-FGC21706) was discovered later than R2a, it has often not been tested for. Hence most results are best described as R2(xR2a).

In addition, relatively little research has been done within South Asia, which is known to have the greatest concentration of R2. (Hence the figures cited in the table right may not be indicative of true frequencies, i.e. Pakistan is the only South Asian country that has been included.)

In 2013, R2(xR2a) was found in 5 out of 19 males from the Burusho minority of North Pakistan.

R2a (R-M124) 

Haplogroup R2a (R-M124) is characterized by SNPs M124, F820/Page4, L381, P249, and is mainly found in South Asia, with lower frequencies in Central Asia and the Caucasus. R-M124 is also found in multiple Jewish populations: Iraqi Jews, Persian Jews, Mountain Jews, and Ashkenazi Jews.

R2b (R-FGC21706) 
It is found especially in the Indian subcontinent.

Phylogenetic tree

Description of the SNP M479

See also

Y-DNA R-M207 subclades

Y-DNA backbone tree

Notes

External links

 Digging into Haplogroup R2 (Y-DNA)
 List of R2 frequency (404)
 R2-M124-WTY (Walk Through the Y) Project
 The India Genealogical DNA Project
 R2 Y-Chromosome Haplogroup DNA Project

R-M479
R

ca:Haplogrup R2 del cromosoma Y humà
es:Haplogrupo R2 ADN-Y
ru:Гаплогруппа R2 (Y-ДНК)